Its first European competition participation occurred in 1997–98 season in UEFA Cup. Vorskla played its first game at this level away at Daugava Stadium in Riga on July 23, 1997 against the Latvian club Daugava Rīga.

Its home games the club plays at Vorskla Stadium.

Statistics by country

Tally per competition

Results

Q = Qualifying
PO = Play-off

Europe
Ukrainian football clubs in international competitions